Ujwaadu is a 2011 Konkani film directed by Kasargod Chinna and produced by KJ Dhananjaya and Anuradha Padiyar as the third film ever produced in the GSB Konkani language and attempts to showcase Konkani Saraswatha tradition and culture.

Released 14 October 2011, and with music by V Manohar, the film stars Shivadhwaj, Neethu, Sadashiv Brahmavar, Sandhya Pai, Prameela Nesargi, Dr. Ananth Prabhu and Umashree.

Plot
Ujwaadu depicts the story of simple happy-go-lucky Gowda Saraswat Brahmins way of life with turmoil and struggle within.

Cast
 Umashree
 Shivadhwaj
 Neethu
 Sadashiv Brahmavar
 Sandhya Pai
 Prameela Nesargi
 Dr. Ananth Prabhu
 Srinivas Sheshgiri Prabhu ( as Gajju)
 Vyas Shenoy (As katte Friend)

Production
Ujwaadu took off with its Muhurat in Bangalore on 22 April 2011 at Kumaraswamy Lay Out. Celebrities from Kannada Film world including Girish Kasaravalli, T. S. Nagabharana, Jayamala, Umashree and Dr. K. Ramesh Kamath who produced and directed Konkani film in the early Eighties namely ‘Jana Mana’.

The film was shot around Karkala and Mangalore, and is the Third film of GSB Konkani language.  Prior to its release, the only two GSB Konkani films produced were Tapaswini and Jana Mana.

References

 Konknni Cholchitram, Isidore Dantas, 2010
 50 Years of Konkani Cinema, Andrew Greno Viegas, 2000

Indian independent films
2011 films
Films scored by V. Manohar
Films shot in Mangalore
2010s Konkani-language films